Magdalene Margrethe Bärens (née Schäffer) (30 September 1737 – 6 June 1808) was a Danish artist. She was one of the first professional female artists in Denmark, and the first woman to be elected into the Royal Danish Academy of Fine Arts. She was a flower- and still-life painter.

Biography 

Bärens was born as the child of Elisabeth Hochkirch and the royal stable master and respected horse expert Johann Hermann Schäffer. She displayed an early talent in drawing, and her father, who assisted the sculptor Jacques-François-Joseph Saly in illustrating the anatomy of horses, encouraged this, while her mother was very negative about her becoming anything else than a wife. After her marriage to the official Johan Georg Bärens in 1761, she initially stopped all artistic activity. However, she resumed it encouraged by the painter Vigilius Erichsen. In 1779, her paintings of flowers in gouache where displayed for the Academy by a professor, and in 1780, she became the first of her sex to be elected to the academy.

Bärens painted still-life paintings, especially flowers, and was appointed royal flower-painter by dowager queen Juliana Maria. To be able to paint flowers during winter, she installed a green house. In 1783 she sent two paintings to Catherine the Great of Russia and was rewarded with a gold medal and 300 speciedukater. In 1788–1790, she visited England and was much admired, but the import-laws stopped any success she could have had there. In Denmark, she unsuccessfully applied to the academy in 1795 for a vacant position there, and in 1796 for a residence at Charlottenborg Palace. As a widow in 1802, she was given a pension.

References 

 Dansk Kvindebiografisk Leksikon (In Danish)

1737 births
1808 deaths
19th-century Danish women artists
18th-century Danish women artists
18th-century Danish painters
19th-century Danish painters
Danish people of German descent
Royal Danish Academy of Fine Arts people
Danish women painters